D34 is a state road in Slavonia region of Croatia connecting the cities of Slatina, Donji Miholjac, Valpovo and Osijek.

The road, as well as all other state roads in Croatia, is managed and maintained by Hrvatske ceste, state owned company.

Traffic volume 

Traffic is regularly counted and reported by Hrvatske ceste, operator of the road.

Road junctions and populated areas

Maps

Sources

D034
D034
D034
D034